Baron Johann Knoop (22 July 1846 in Moscow – 9 May 1918 in Wadhurst), was a collector of musical instruments who possessed a total of 29 great violins, violas, and cellos at one time or another including some four Stradivari violas. Several instruments are named after him:

 Baron Knoop Stradivarius (1698)
 Alard-Baron Knoop Stradivarius (1715)
 Baron Knoop; ex-Bevan Stradivarius (1715)

Knoop's father, Johann Ludwig Knoop (1821-1894), emigrated from Germany to Russia, founded a textile industry in Narva, Estonia, and was granted the Russian title of "Baron", which he passed to his sons.

References
 Doring, Ernest N., "The Baron Knoop". Violins and Violinists, Sep-Oct. 1954, p 196 - 201

External links
Cozio Catalogue by Owner
The Way Famous String Instruments Went

Collectors
1846 births
1918 deaths